Gabbioneta-Binanuova is a comune (municipality) in the Province of Cremona in the Italian region Lombardy, about  southeast of Milan and about  northeast of Cremona.

Gabbioneta-Binanuova borders the following municipalities: Grontardo, Ostiano, Pescarolo ed Uniti, Pessina Cremonese, Scandolara Ripa d'Oglio, Seniga.

The parish church, Santi Martino e Nicola is dedicated to the two saints. The church of Sant'Ambrogio was patronized by the Pallavicini family.

Demographic evolution

References

Cities and towns in Lombardy